Sukhmani – Hope for Life is a 2010 Indian Punjabi-language film directed by Manjeet Maan and starring Gurdas Maan, Juhi Chawla, Divya Dutta and Bhagwant Mann. It was produced by Gurdas, Manjeet's husband, and their son Gurikk Maan. It has been made by the Maan's own production company - Sai Lok Sangeet, with screenplay by Irshad Kamil, music by Jaidev Kumar and lyrics written by Gurdas Maan. Music to the film was released on 6 January 2010 and includes vocals from Gurdas Maan, Shreya Ghoshal and for the first time ever in her career - Juhi Chawla has sung alongside Gurdas Maan in a duet for the song "Preeto " and "Nanhi Si Gudiya".

The film was distributed by the UK Box Office who also helped in producing the film.

Synopsis
Sukhmani- Hope For Life is a story based on the Journey of Major Kuldeep Singh, played by Gurdas Maan, a decorated officer of the Para Battalion, who overcomes personal trauma and social indignity to uphold the morals of the army and the honour of a woman rejected by society and family, while keeping alive the memory of his beloved daughter Sukhmani.

On that fateful day when the beautiful valley of Jammu and Kashmir is bloodied by the gruesome killings of his devoted wife and treasured daughter at the hands terrorists, Major. Kuldeep Singh’s life is thrown into disarray. To maintain his sanity and avoid falling into a black hole of depression, he returns to his duty, fighting the terrorists with renewed vigor and the need to avenge his family. When for a second time he fails to save the life of an innocent girl who becomes a victim of the terrorism, he becomes a broken man. However, a soldier’s war is never over and when duty calls again, he goes out to repatriate innocent civilians from the Wagah Border. It is after meeting Reshma, he decides that protecting her from the social stigma of society as well as from the evil intentions of his own comrade has becomes his goal in life. He faces dishonour and social exclusion, but unwaveringly fights back for his rights, the rights of a woman dispelled by society and the future of a little girl who has nothing to do with terrorism and the hatred in this world.

Sukhmani shows us that both good and evil lie within each of us, however when faced with exceptional circumstances, each human acts differently. It shows us that sometimes we have to make choices that are not always accepted by society. Sukhmani shows us that there is hope for life...

Cast
 Gurdas Maan as Major Kuldeep Singh
 Juhi Chawla as Major's wife
 Divya Dutta
 Shammi in a Guest Appearance
 Roshan Abbas
 Anita Kanwar
 Bhagwant Maan as a military man
 Anup Soni

Awards

PTC Punjabi Film Awards 2011
At first PTC Punjabi Film Awards Sukhmani won various awards under different categories .
 Best Director Award: Manjeet Mann
 Best Actress Award: Divya Dutta
 Best Editing Award: Omkarnath Bhakri
 Best Story Award: Suraj Sanim/Manoj Punj
 Critics Best Actor Award: Gurdas Mann
 Critics Best Film Award: Sukhmani – Hope for Life

References

External links
Sukhmani - Hope for Life Main Website

Gurdas Maan Official Website

Punjabi-language Indian films
2010s Punjabi-language films
Films scored by Jaidev Kumar